Robert J. O'Neill (born 10 April 1976) is a former United States Navy SEAL (1996–2012), TV news contributor, and author.  After participating in May 2011's Operation Neptune Spear with SEAL Team Six, O'Neill was the subject of controversy for claiming to be the sole individual to kill Osama bin Laden.

Personal life
Born in Butte, Montana, on 10 April 1976, Robert J. O'Neill is the son of Tom O'Neill, Jim and Diane Johnson, and the brother of Tom O'Neill.  O'Neill described his childhood in Butte as "idyllic".  He graduated from Butte Central High School in 1994, and has attended Montana Technological University.  O'Neill married in March 2004, and has at least two children, though he and his spouse were legally separated by February 2013.

A fan of the Washington Redskins, O'Neill was able to meet the team a week after his claim of shooting bin Laden was publicized in 2014.  On 20 August 2020, amid the COVID-19 pandemic, O'Neill tweeted a selfie of himself seated aboard a Delta Air Lines plane without a face mask; it was captioned "I'm not a pussy" and was followed by another that said, "Thank God it wasn't @Delta flying us in when we killed bin Laden ... we weren't wearing masks".  He later tweeted that he was banned by Delta.

Career

United States Navy
O'Neill told Esquire that he found himself in a United States Navy recruiting office after a relationship breakup.  After expressing interest in becoming a sniper, O'Neill enlisted on 29 January 1996, and joined the Navy SEALs that same year.  O'Neill reported to Basic Underwater Demolition/SEAL training (BUD/S) at Naval Amphibious Base Coronado and graduated from BUD/S class 208.

In 2013, O'Neill told The Montana Standard that he helped rescue SEAL Marcus Luttrell in Afghanistan, and that he was SEAL Team Six's "lead paratrooper" in the rescue of Richard Phillips from the Maersk Alabama hijacking; these missions were the bases of the 2013 films Lone Survivor and Captain Phillips, respectively.  However, the former commander of SEAL Team Six said in 2014 that O'Neill had not played a "singular role" on either mission, adding that "O’Neill's specific role on any of these missions is irrelevant because everything we do is as a team."

During his enlistment, O'Neill received two Silver Stars, four Bronze Star Medals, a Joint Service Commendation Medal (with "V" device), three Presidential Unit Citations, and two Navy and Marine Corps Commendation Medals (with "V" device).  He served with SEAL Teams Two (1996–2001), Four (2001–2004), and Six (2004–2012), and attained the rank of senior chief petty officer.  Upon his discharge from the Navy on 24 August 2012 (after ), O'Neill was still assigned to SEAL Team Six at Virginia Beach, Virginia and had six months and 15 days of sea service to his credit.  O'Neill claimed in 2014 that he left the military because he no longer felt "adrenaline when people are shooting, and I knew that that could lead to complacency because if I am not afraid of, that I might wind up doing something stupid thinking that I can't get hurt".  O'Neill estimated that with the Navy and SEALs, he annually earned .

Killing Osama bin Laden

In an anonymous February 2013 interview, O'Neill told Esquire that he had killed Osama bin Laden during Operation Neptune Spear.  In late 2014, in the run-up to credited Fox News and Washington Post stories on the same topic, O'Neill's name was leaked by other former special forces personnel who were protesting his violation of "a code of silence that forbids them from publicly taking credit for their actions."  O'Neill claimed that he and another unnamed member of SEAL Team Six cornered bin Laden, and that after the other SEAL fired and missed, O'Neill killed the terrorist leader with shots to the head.

Fellow SEAL Matt Bissonnette claims in No Easy Day that the unnamed point man actually fired the killing shots.  According to The Intercept interview of a former SEAL Team 6 member, when O'Neill arrived at the terrorist leader, bin Laden was already "bleeding out on the floor, possibly already dead, after being shot in the chest and leg by the lead assaulter on the raid."  According to another SEAL, O'Neill merely walked over to the immobile al-Qaeda leader and shot him twice in the head.  The Intercept said that both O'Neill's and Bissonnette's accountings of the mission "contain multiple self-serving falsehoods."

, the federal government of the United States had neither confirmed nor denied O'Neill's claims, though Rear Admiral Brian L. Losey and Force Master Chief Michael Magaraci did encourage all SEALs to abide by their code of silence, saying, "At Naval Special Warfare's core is the SEAL ethos […] A critical  of our ethos is 'I do not advertise the nature of my work, nor seek recognition for my actions.' Our ethos is a life-long commitment and obligation, both in and out of the service. Violators of our ethos are neither teammates in good standing, nor teammates who represent Naval Special Warfare."

Of his decision to lay claim to killing bin Laden, O'Neill told CBS News that "I think it's a difficult secret to keep, […] Everyone was proud. I think it was apparent that we had done it."  In 2015, O'Neill and his family were allegedly threatened by the Islamic State of Iraq and the Levant.

On October 14, 2020, US President Donald Trump re-tweeted an unfounded conspiracy theory that suggested Osama bin Laden was still alive and a body double was shot.  O'Neill, who was a supporter of Trump, responded with a series of tweets, including "It was not a body double. Thank you Mr. President."  That same month, CNN published an interview with retired Admiral William H. McRaven; the former flag officer who oversaw Neptune Spear responded to the claims mentioning that "Rob O'Neill, the SEAL that, in fact, shot bin Laden".

Post-military work
After separating from the US Navy, O'Neill began working as a motivational speaker.  In 2015, he became a contributor to the cable news channel Fox News, though had left the company by August 2021, instead appearing on competitor Newsmax TV that October.  O'Neill has also published two books:

 
 With

References

External links
 
 
 
 

1976 births
21st-century biographers
21st-century male writers
American writers
autobiographers
killing of Osama bin Laden
living people
male biographers
motivational speakers
recipients of the Silver Star
SEAL Team Six personnel
United States Navy sailors